Focus Media Information Technology, formerly Focus Media Holding, is a Chinese company which operates out-of-home advertising in China which consist predominantly of digital signage screens and claims to own the country's largest Internet advertising agency.

Alleged fraud
In November 2011, Muddy Waters Research reported massive fraud and corruption within the company. Focus denied the allegations. The company was subsequently taken private by a private equity consortium in May 2013.

References

External links
 

Companies in the CSI 100 Index
Companies listed on the Shenzhen Stock Exchange
Advertising agencies of China
Chinese brands
Companies based in Shanghai
Marketing companies established in 2003
Companies formerly listed on the Nasdaq
The Carlyle Group
Fosun International
Chinese companies established in 2003